Museo Regional de Atacama is a museum in the Chilean city of Copiapó, the capital of Atacama Region. The museum had 2,117 visitors in 2020.

References

Museums in Atacama Region
Archaeological museums in Chile
Mining museums
Pre-Columbian art museums
Local museums in Chile